E. Lloyd Sheldon (May 27, 1886 – January 24, 1957) was an American screenwriter, film producer, and film editor. He wrote for more than 40 films between 1916 and 1942. He also produced 19 films between 1927 and 1939. He was born in Springfield, Massachusetts, and died in Los Angeles.

Selected filmography

 The Weakness of Man (1916)
 A Branded Soul (1917)
 The Honeymoon (1917)
 The Forbidden Path (1918)
 When a Woman Sins (1918)
 Other Men's Daughters (1918)
 Marriage for Convenience (1919)
 Wolves of the Night (1919)
 Married in Haste (1919)
 The White Moll (1920)
 Bride 13 (1920)
 Sisters (1922)
 The Half-Way Girl (1925)
 Flaming Waters (1925)
 Aloma of the South Seas (1926)
 You'd Be Surprised (1926)
 Hotel Imperial (1927)
 It (1927)
 Children of Divorce (1927)
 Underworld (1927)
 Ladies of the Mob (1928)
 Sins of the Fathers (1928)
 City Streets (1931)
 Death Takes a Holiday (1934)
 The Last Outpost (1935)
 Hands Across the Table (1935)
 The Milky Way (1936)

References

External links

1886 births
1957 deaths
American male screenwriters
American film producers
American film editors
20th-century American male writers
20th-century American screenwriters